Walter B. Stevens (1848-1939) was a journalist and secretary and publicity director of the Louisiana Purchase Exposition Company and the author of books on the history of Missouri.

Personal life

Stevens was born to A.A. Stevens and Mary Bristol Stevens on July 25, 1848, in Meriden, Connecticut, and spent his early life in Illinois. He had five siblings.

He graduated with honors from the University of Michigan in 1870 and earned a master's degree there in 1873.

After retirement, he lived on a farm in Kansas, where he raised livestock and continued his writing. He moved to Georgetown, South Carolina in 1926.

He died at the age of 91 in Georgetown on August 28, 1939, and was buried in Georgetown Cemetery, South Carolina. He was survived by his wife and brothers M.P. Stevens of Los Angeles and E.A. Stevens of New York.

Professional life

Journalism
Stevens began work as a reporter for the St. Louis Times in 1870 and by 1877 was its chief editor. He worked for the St. Louis Globe-Democrat in 1875. He was city editor of the Times in July 1878 when he was overcome by a heatstroke during exceedingly hot weather. He was still working for the Times when it went out of business in 1880.

He moved to the St. Louis Globe-Democrat in 1881, becoming city editor and leaving that position in 1883. He was then made correspondent in Washington, D.C., and the Globe sent him on assignment through Missouri, Canada, Mexico, Cuba, Jamaica, and Panama; his articles, signed W.B.S., brought him recognition as a writer.

In May 1888, Stevens was a witness for six hours during the Lancaster v. Glover libel trial in Washington concerning events he took part in when on assignment there. In 1891, he was  called as a witness to a House of Representatives hearing concerning an investigation of speculation during proposed silver legislation.

Stevens became one of the editors and proprietors of The Southport (North Carolina) Leader in 1894 and continued working for the Globe.

Other work

Stevens left journalism in 1901 to become secretary and publicity director of the Louisiana Purchase Exposition Company.

Memberships
Stevens was one of the organizers of St. Louis's Veiled Prophet Ball and Parade in 1878. He was elected president of the Washington Gridiron Club in December 1894.

He was a member of the St. Louis Burns Club, secretary of the St. Louis City Plan Commission from 1912 to 1916 and executive secretary of the Fourth American Peace Conference in St. Louis in 1913. He was president of the State Historical Society of Missouri from 1916 to 1925.

References

Other reading

  Stevens as a speaker at University of Michigan graduation, 1870. "Michigan: The University," Detroit Free Press, June 30, 1870, image 1

External links

 List of books by Stevens on Goodreads.com

19th-century American journalists
1848 births
1939 deaths
People from Meriden, Connecticut
University of Michigan alumni
American male journalists